In molecular biology, T-cell leukemia/lymphoma 6 (non-protein coding), also known as TCL6 is a long non-coding RNA. It is expressed in T-cell leukemia with a t(14;14)(q11;q32.1) chromosome translocation in humans and in a mouse model. It is not expressed in normal T-cells. It may be involved in leukemogenesis.

See also
 Long noncoding RNA

References

Non-coding RNA